Trinity College of Florida is a private interdenominational evangelical Bible college in Trinity, Florida. It was founded in 1932.

History 
The institution was founded as Florida Bible Institute in 1932, in Temple Terrace by Dr. William T. Watson, an evangelical tent preacher from North Carolina and pastor of a large Christian and Missionary Alliance church in St. Petersburg. The name was changed to Trinity College of Florida in 1947.

Accreditation 
The college was accredited by the Commission on Accreditation of the Association for Biblical Higher Education in 1996 and maintains this accreditation today.

Athletics 
Trinity College of Florida's athletic program consists of four sports teams: men's basketball, men's soccer, women's basketball, and women's volleyball. All four participate in the NCCAA Division II.

"The Trinity College men's basketball program took first place in the Bible College National Invitational Tournament in 2016."

Notable alumni
 Billy Graham – evangelist
 KB – Christian hip hop artist
 Jimmy G. Tharpe – founder of Louisiana Baptist University

Notable professors 
 Thomas E. Woodward

References

External links 

 

Association for Biblical Higher Education
Private universities and colleges in Florida
Bible colleges
Educational institutions established in 1932
Buildings and structures in Pasco County, Florida
Education in Pasco County, Florida
1932 establishments in Florida